Phyciodes cocyta, the northern crescent, is a butterfly of the family Nymphalidae. It is found in the Nearctic realm.

The wingspan is 32–38 mm. The butterfly flies from June to July depending on the location. Its habitats include fields, meadows, glades, and openings in woodlands.

The larvae feed on Asteraceae species. Adults feed on nectar from dogbane, fleabane, and white clover.

Similar species
Phyciodes batesii – tawny crescent
Phyciodes tharos – pearl crescent

References

External links

Butterflies and Moths of North America
Northern crescent, Butterflies of Canada

Melitaeini
Butterflies of North America
Taxa named by Pieter Cramer